Sailin' is the third studio album by Kim Carnes, released in 1976 (see 1976 in music). The record was recorded, in part, in Muscle Shoals, Alabama with the famed Muscle Shoals Rhythm Section.  Although this album hasn't been released on CD, all of the album's songs can be found on the European CD "Kim Carnes - Master Series" released by A&M in 1999.

Background
Sailin''' was recorded at the Muscle Shoals Sound Studio in Sheffield, Alabama with producers Jerry Wexler and Barry Beckett. Carnes and Ellingson received the Professional Grand Prize at the American Song Festival, and Best Composition at the Tokyo Song Festival, for "Love Comes from the Most Unexpected Places" in 1976. Barbra Streisand later covered the song on her album Superman, released in the following year. Streisand had offered the song to film director Richard Brooks for the opening credits of Looking for Mr. Goodbar, but he declined.

Critical receptionBillboard described Sailin' as "an outstanding effort" from Carnes, showing "strength with lyrics and melodies" a voice that "reflects white gospel roots". Cashbox'' described "Let Your Love Come Easy" as having "good chorus hooks and snappy instrumentation".

Track listing

Personnel
Adapted from the album liner notes.

 Kim Carnes – all vocals; writer ; acoustic piano ; backing vocals
 Jerry Wexler – producer
 Barry Beckett – producer, keyboards; horn arrangements 
 Jack Adams – engineer
 Steve Gursky – assistant engineer
 Jim Skiathigis – set-up man
 David Hood – bass guitar
 Roger Hawkins – drums, percussion
 Pete Carr – lead guitar, acoustic guitars, dobro
 Jimmy Johnson – acoustic guitars, rhythm electric guitar
 Tom Roady – percussion
 David Grisman – mandolin ; backing vocals 
 Julia Tillman – backing vocals
 Maxine Willard – backing vocals
 Dave Ellingson – writer ; backing vocals 
 Blackie Shackner – harmonica 
 Harrison Calloway – horns ; horn arrangements 
 Harvey Thompson – horns 
 Charles Rose – horns 
 Ron Eades – horns 
 Bill Cuomo – acoustic piano ; string arrangements 
 Bob Wilber – horn arrangements, soprano saxophone 
 Mike Lewis – string arrangements 
 Robert Basso – concertmaster
 Chris Colclesser – flute solo 
Technical
 Roland Young – art direction
 Chuck Beeson – album design
 Lisa Powers – photography 
 Jim Mayfield – photography

Release history

References

1976 albums
Kim Carnes albums
Albums produced by Jerry Wexler
Albums produced by Barry Beckett
A&M Records albums
Albums recorded at Muscle Shoals Sound Studio